László Disztl (born 4 June 1962) is a Hungarian retired footballer who played mainly as a right back. He is currently the assistant manager of Kaposvári Rákóczi FC.

Football career
Disztl was born in Baja. During his career he played mainly for Videoton FC, and was an important member of the team which eventually finished runner-up in the 1984–85 UEFA Cup, to Real Madrid.

After two years with Budapest Honvéd FC, Disztl moved abroad, to Belgium's Club Brugge KV, and closed his career at 33 with his first club, which he briefly managed in 2008.

Disztl gained 28 caps for Hungary and, like namesake Péter, appeared at the 1986 FIFA World Cup. His only international goal came against Italy on 17 October 1990, for the UEFA Euro 1992 qualifiers (1–1 home draw).

Honours
Videoton
UEFA Cup: Runner-up 1984–85

Club Brugge
Belgian Pro League: 1989–90, 1991–92
Belgian Cup: 1990–91
Belgian Supercup: 1990, 1991, 1992, 1994
Bruges Matins: 1990, 1992, 1993

References

External links
 

1962 births
Living people
Hungarian people of German descent
Hungarian footballers
People from Baja, Hungary
Association football defenders
Nemzeti Bajnokság I players
Fehérvár FC players
Budapest Honvéd FC players
Belgian Pro League players
Club Brugge KV players
Hungary international footballers
1986 FIFA World Cup players
Hungarian expatriate footballers
Expatriate footballers in Belgium
Hungarian expatriate sportspeople in Belgium
Hungarian football managers
Fehérvár FC managers
Zalaegerszegi TE managers
Sportspeople from Bács-Kiskun County